Joseph Bennett  was an English champion player of English billiards. He was the billiards champion three times when it was played on a challenge basis.

Biography 
Bennett was born in 1842 in Town Malling, Kent, and played his first billiards match aged 22.

In November 1870, Bennett played John Roberts Jr. for the Billiards Championship and £200, and won the title with the scoreline 1,000-905. The match was watched by over 300 spectators. Roberts beat Bennett 1,000-637 the following year, in January 1871, to regain the title.

Bennett made a further unsuccessful title challenge in November 1871, losing 942–1,000 to William Cook, but won the title again in November 1880, beating Cook 1,000-949. Bennett successfully defended the title in January 1881, beating Tom Taylor 1,000-910. During the match against Taylor, Bennett set a new championship record  of 125.

In September 1881, Bennett, who had broken his arm when being thrown out of a gig, resigned the title when challenged by Cook. He made one further unsuccessful challenge for the title, losing 1,360-3,000 against Roberts in June 1885.

He taught billiards in London. Following a stroke on Christmas Day 1904, he died on 17 January 1905 at his home in Mayfair, London, from "apoplexy following a state of paralysis."

Titles won 
28 November 1870, 1,000–905 against John Roberts, Jr. 
8 November 1880, 1,000–949 against William Cook   
12–13 January 1881, 1,000–910 against Tom Taylor

In fiction
Bennett is briefly mentioned in Flashman at the Charge (1973) by George MacDonald Fraser.

References

External links
 Joseph Bennett biography at the Billiard and Snooker Heritage Collection.

English players of English billiards
World champions in English billiards
1842 births
1905 deaths
Sportspeople from Kent
People from West Malling
People from Mayfair